Ceralocyna is a genus of beetles in the family Cerambycidae, containing the following species:

 Ceralocyna aliciae Hovore & Chemsak, 2005
 Ceralocyna amabilis Monné & Napp, 1999
 Ceralocyna coccinea Monné & Napp, 1999
 Ceralocyna cribricollis (Bates, 1885)
 Ceralocyna foveicollis (Buquet, 1854)
 Ceralocyna fulvipes Viana, 1971
 Ceralocyna marcelae Hovore & Chemsak, 2005
 Ceralocyna margareteae Martins & Galileo, 1994
 Ceralocyna militaris (Gounelle, 1911)
 Ceralocyna nigricollis (Ratcliffe, 1911)
 Ceralocyna nigricornis (Gounelle, 1911)
 Ceralocyna nigropilosa Monné & Napp, 1999
 Ceralocyna onorei Hovore & Chemsak, 2005
 Ceralocyna parkeri (Chemsak, 1964)
 Ceralocyna seticornis (Bates, 1870)
 Ceralocyna terminata (Buquet, 1854)
 Ceralocyna variegata Monné & Napp, 1999
 Ceralocyna venusta Martins & Galileo, 2010

References

 
Trachyderini
Cerambycidae genera